Kei Nishikori was the defending champion, but lost to Benoît Paire in the semifinals.

Stan Wawrinka won the title, defeating Paire in the final, 6–2, 6–4.

Seeds

Draw

Finals

Top half

Bottom half

Qualifying

Seeds

Qualifiers

Qualifying draw

First qualifier

Second qualifier

Third qualifier

Fourth qualifier

External links
 Main draw
 Qualifying draw

2015 Japan Open Tennis Championships